Media spaces are electronic settings in which groups of people can work together, even when they are not present in the same place and time. In a media space, people can create real-time visual and acoustic environments that span physically separate areas. They can also control the recording, accessing and replaying of images and sounds from those environments.

Media Spaces were the subject of research during the mid- and late-1980s, led by Robert Stults and Steve Harrison, in the Smalltalk group at Xerox Palo Alto Research Center (PARC). The research was carried out in the Design and Media Spaces Area of the Software Concepts Laboratory, as part of a larger inquiry into systems and media to support the social process of design.

The Media Space at Xerox PARC was implemented in laboratory sites in Palo Alto, California, and Portland, Oregon. These employed live and recorded audio and video, video and audio switching, networked workstations and servers, and inter-site network connection, in order to provide for a form of telepresence within offices and work areas at the two sites. Interactions among staff at the sites were conveyed in real time by video and audio, and by the networked workstations; and the interactions were recorded and played back, and digital indexes of the records were prototyped. The live and recorded interactions permitted communications among the connected spaces, as well as asynchronous participation. Recording and retrieval, integrated with persistent live connection, was a major distinguishing feature between Media Space and videoconferencing as it was understood at the time.

References

Further reading

 Aoki, et al., Media Spaces in the Mobile World, CSCW 2006.
 Beirne, et al., Issues in Deploying the Technology for a Media Space Field Study, University of Toronto, 1994.
 William Buxton, Space-Function Integration and Ubiquitous Media, Toronto, Canada 2005.
 Steve Harrison, ed., Media Space: 20+ Years of Mediated Life, London, Springer, 2009.  DOI 10.1007/978-1-84882-483-6 ; eBook ; Hardcover ; Softcover 
 Rachel Lori Kern, Monkey Business, Thesis for MS in Media Studies, MIT, Cambridge 2006.
 Marilyn M. Mantei, et al., Experiences in the Use of a Media Space, University of Toronto, Ontario 1991.
 Carman Neustaedter, Steve Harrison, Tejinder Judge, eds (2012). Connecting Families: The Impact of New Communication Technologies on Domestic Life. London: Springer CSCW book series. https://doi.org/10.1007/978-1-4471-4192-1_1; Online ; Print 
Nitin Sawhney, Situated Awareness Spaces, MIT Media Laboratory, October 2000.
 Konrad Tollmar, et al., VideoCafe, Stockholm, Sweden 1999

External links
 VisAge: Original current implementation of a Media Space. 

User interface techniques
Collaborative software